MTV Eesti was a twenty-four-hour music and entertainment channel operated by MTV Networks Europe. The channel began on 4 September 2006 at 22:00 EEST. The channel was available in Estonia.

History
In 2006, MTV Networks Europe established MTV Networks Baltic, a new broadcasting service which provided localized channels for Latvia, Lithuania and Estonia. MTV Networks Baltic launched three separate channels within the region in September 2006.
In 2008, MTV Networks International signed a new licensing agreement with Israeli Communications company Ananey Communications to operate and manage the MTV brand within the Baltic Region.
The channel ceased broadcasting on 18 November 2009.
As of 19 November 2009 MTV Europe has replaced MTV Baltic channels.

VJs
 Piret Järvis (2007–2008)

Channel content
Similar to other MTV channels in Europe. MTV Estonia featured both local and international entertainments shows.

 Superock
 Party Zone
 Chill Out Zone
 Alternative Nation
 Nu Rave
 MTV Amour
 Baltic Top 20
 Dancefloor Chart
 Euro Top 20
 UK Top 10
 Hitlist Base Chart
 Rock Chart
 Top 10 @ 10
 World Chart Express
 Fist of Zen
 Pimp My Ride
 Futurama
 My Super Sweet 16
 The City
 Parental Control
 Exposed
 Busted
 A Double Shot at Love
 Happy Tree Friends
 MTV Cribs

References

MTV channels
Defunct television channels in Estonia
Television channels and stations established in 2006
Television channels and stations disestablished in 2009
2006 establishments in Estonia
2009 disestablishments in Estonia
Mass media in Tallinn
Music organizations based in Estonia